Amphibious rat may refer to:
 Amphinectomys savamis, the amphibious rat, of Peru
 Lundomys molitor, Lund's amphibious rat, of Uruguay and southern Brazil
 Nilopegamys plumbeus, the Ethiopian amphibious rat, of Ethiopia

Animal common name disambiguation pages